The Koroa were one of the groups of indigenous people who lived in the Mississippi Valley prior to the European settlement of the region. They lived in the northwest of present-day Mississippi in the Yazoo River basin.

Language 
The Koroa are believed to have spoken a dialect of Tunica. However, French missionaries described the Koroa (which they spelled Courouais) as speaking the same language as the Yazoo but a different tongue from the Tunica. This may be describing a distinct dialect or a related Tunican language.

History 
The Koroa may be the tribe identified by Hernando de Soto's expedition as the Coligua or Cologoa.  They were met by Soto's company in the area of what is today Little Rock, Arkansas, in 1541.

Jacques Marquette referred to this tribe by the name Akoroa.  The Koroa lived on both sides of the Mississippi River when the French encountered them in the late 17th century.  At least one of their villages was on the east bank of the river. In 1682, La Salle visited a Koroa village on the Western side of the Mississippi twice, both on the descent and the return journey. His party was feasted there, and saw Quinipissas, whom they described as the Koroa's allies, living in the village.

A 1698 French missionary expedition also found them living in the same area as the Tunica, Yazoo, and Houspé, and Father Antoine Davion was assigned to missionize them.

In 1702, a French Catholic missionary named Nicolas Foucault was killed while serving among the Koroa. The tribe's leaders had the murderers executed. Many members of the Koroa tribe joined with the Tunica, Chickasaw, or Natchez tribes after European diseases had severely depleted their population.

See also 
List of sites and peoples visited by the Hernando de Soto Expedition

Sources 
 Gibson, Arrell M. "The Indians of Mississippi," in McLemore, Richard Aubrey, ed. A History of Mississippi (Hattiesburg: University and College Press of Mississippi, 1973) vol. 1

References 

Middle Mississippian culture
Native American tribes in Mississippi
Native American tribes in Arkansas
Extinct Native American peoples